"Love Lasts Forever" is a song by English new wave and synth-pop band Kissing the Pink, released as both a 7" and 12" single from their debut studio album, Naked (1983). Produced by Peter Walsh, "Love Lasts Forever" was the follow up single to their Top 20 hit "The Last Film", but it only peaked at No. 85 on the UK Singles Chart. The single features an instrumental version of the non-album track, "Underage" as its B-side.

Track listing
7" single
"Love Lasts Forever"
"Underage (Instrumental Version)"

12" single
"Love Lasts Forever"
"Underage (Extended Instrumental Version)"

Chart performance

References

External links
 

Kissing the Pink songs
1983 singles
1983 songs